Ding Dong Who Rang the Bell was the debut album by Franciscus Henri, released in 1972 by Fable Records, on 33 rpm vinyl record. Henri himself painted the album's jacket and he recorded the album at top Melbourne studio Armstrong Studios, who by now had relocated to 180 Bank Street, South Melbourne and had taken over a former butter factory.

Track listing

References

Personnel
 Franciscus Henri - vocals, guitar
 Geoff Cox - drums, percussion, quacking
 Rick Berger - bass
 Phil Gardiner - guitar
 Nick Alexander - keyboards, recorder

1972 albums
Franciscus Henri albums